In mathematics, a real-valued function  defined on a connected open set  is said to have a conjugate (function)  if and only if they are respectively the real and imaginary parts of a holomorphic function  of the complex variable   That is,  is conjugate to  if  is holomorphic on   As a first consequence of the definition, they are both harmonic real-valued functions on . Moreover, the conjugate of  if it exists, is unique up to an additive constant.

Description

This is well known in applications as (essentially) the Hilbert transform; it is also a basic example in mathematical analysis, in connection with singular integral operators. Conjugate harmonic functions (and the transform between them) are also one of the simplest examples of a Bäcklund transform (two PDEs and a transform relating their solutions), in this case linear; more complex transforms are of interest in solitons and integrable systems.

Geometrically u and v are related as having orthogonal trajectories, away from the zeros of the underlying holomorphic function; the contours on which u and v are constant cross at right angles. In this regard, u + iv would be the complex potential, where u is the potential function and v is the stream function.

Examples

For example, consider the function 

Since

and

it satisfies

( is the Laplace operator) and is thus harmonic. Now suppose we have a  such that the Cauchy–Riemann equations are satisfied:

and

Simplifying,

and

which when solved gives

The conformal mapping property of analytic functions (at points where the derivative is not zero) gives rise to a geometric property of harmonic conjugates. Clearly the harmonic conjugate of x is y, and the lines of constant x and constant y are orthogonal. Conformality says that contours of constant  and  will also be orthogonal where they cross (away from the zeros of ). That means that v is a specific solution of the orthogonal trajectory problem for the family of contours given by u (not the only solution, naturally, since we can take also functions of v): the question, going back to the mathematics of the seventeenth century, of finding the curves that cross a given family of non-intersecting curves at right angles.

Harmonic conjugate in geometry

There is an additional occurrence of the term harmonic conjugate in mathematics, and more specifically in projective geometry. Two points A and B are said to be harmonic conjugates of each other with respect to another pair of points C, D if the cross ratio (ABCD) equals −1.

References

External links
 Harmonic Ratio
 

Harmonic functions
Partial differential equations